The Pezizaceae (commonly referred to as cup fungi)  are a family of fungi in the Ascomycota which produce mushrooms that tend to grow in the shape of a "cup".  Spores are formed on the inner surface of the fruit body (mushroom). The cup shape typically serves to focus raindrops into splashing spores out of the cup.  Additionally, the curvature enables wind currents to blow the spores out in a different manner than in most agarics and boletes.

Cup fungi grow in peculiar shapes, frequently resembling cups or saucers. For example, the orange peel fungus (Aleuria aurantia) resembles a discarded orange rind.  They may be vividly colored, like the scarlet cup (Sarcoscypha coccinea), which is often one of the first signs of spring where it grows. According to one 2008 estimate, the family contains 31 genera and 230 species.

Subtaxa
Pezizaceae includes the following:
Adelphella 
Adelphella babingtonii 
Amylascus 
Amylascus tasmanicus 
Aquapeziza 
Aquapeziza globispora 
Boudiera 
Boudiera acanthospora 
Boudiera dennisii 
Boudiera tracheia 
Calongea 
Calongea prieguensis 
Cazia 
Cazia flexiascus 
Chromelosporium 
Chromelosporium carneum 
Chromelosporium macrospermum 
Delastria 
Delastria rosea 
Delastria supernova 
Elderia 
Elderia arenivaga 
Galactinia 
Galactinia pseudosylvestris 
Glischroderma 
Hapsidomyces 
Hapsidomyces venezuelensis 
Hydnobolites 
Hydnobolites californicus 
Hydnobolites cerebriformis 
Hydnoplicata 
Hydnoplicata convoluta 
Hydnotryopsis 
Hydnotryopsis gautierioides 
Hydnotryopsis gilkeyae 
Hydnotryopsis setchellii 
Imaia 
Imaia gigantea 
Iodophanus 
Iodophanus carneus 
Iodophanus hyperboreus 
Iodophanus testaceus 
Iodowynnea 
Iodowynnea auriformis 
Kalaharituber 
Kalaharituber pfeilii 
Luteoamylascus 
Luteoamylascus aculeatus 
Mattirolomyces 
Mattirolomyces austroafricanus 
Mattirolomyces mexicanus 
Mattirolomyces mulpu 
Mattirolomyces spinosus 
Mattirolomyces terfezioides 
Muciturbo 
Mycoclelandia 
Mycoclelandia arenacea 
Mycoclelandia bulundari 
Oedocephalum 
Oedocephalum adhaerens 
Oedocephalum elegans 
Oedocephalum nayoroense 
Pachyella 
Pachyella adnata 
Pachyella babingtonii 
Pachyella clypeata 
Pachyella habrospora 
Pachyella punctispora 
Pachyella violaceonigra 
Pachyphlodes 
Pachyphlodes austro-oregonensis 
Pachyphlodes carneus 
Pachyphlodes citrinus 
Pachyphlodes conglomerata 
Pachyphlodes depressus 
Pachyphlodes ligericus 
Pachyphlodes marronina 
Pachyphlodes melanoxanthus 
Pachyphlodes nemoralis 
Pachyphlodes pfisteri 
Pachyphlodes thysellii 
Pachyphlodes virescens 
Pachyphloeus 
Pachyphloeus oleiferus 
Peziza 
Peziza alaskana 
Peziza alcis 
Peziza ammophila 
Peziza ampelina 
Peziza ampliata 
Peziza apiculata 
Peziza arvernensis 
Peziza atrovinosa 
Peziza badia 
Peziza badioconfusa 
Peziza badiofusca 
Peziza bananincola 
Peziza berthetiana 
Peziza bovina 
Peziza brunneoatra 
Peziza buxea 
Peziza campestris 
Peziza depressa 
Peziza domiciliana 
Peziza echinospora 
Peziza ellipsospora 
Peziza emileia 
Peziza erini 
Peziza exogelatinosa 
Peziza fimeti 
Peziza flavida 
Peziza fruticosa 
Peziza gerardii 
Peziza granularis 
Peziza griseo-rosea 
Peziza halophila 
Peziza howsei 
Peziza infossa 
Peziza infuscata 
Peziza irina 
Peziza kallioi 
Peziza limnaea 
Peziza lividula 
Peziza lobulata 
Peziza lohjaoensis 
Peziza luteoloflavida 
Peziza michelii 
Peziza montirivicola 
Peziza moseri 
Peziza muscicola 
Peziza natrophila 
Peziza ninguis 
Peziza nivalis 
Peziza nordica 
Peziza obtuspiculata 
Peziza oceanica 
Peziza oliviae 
Peziza ostracoderma 
Peziza perdicina 
Peziza petersii 
Peziza phlebospora 
Peziza phyllogena 
Peziza polaripapulata 
Peziza praetervisa 
Peziza proteana 
Peziza proteana f. proteana 
Peziza proteana f. sparassoides 
Peziza pseudoammophila 
Peziza pseudoammophila var. bonii 
Peziza pseudovesiculosa 
Peziza pseudoviolacea 
Peziza pudicella 
Peziza pyrophila 
Peziza quelepidotia 
Peziza repanda 
Peziza retrocurvata 
Peziza retrocurvatoides 
Peziza saccardoana 
Peziza saniosa 
Peziza shearii 
Peziza stuntzii 
Peziza subcitrina 
Peziza subclavipes 
Peziza subisabellina 
Peziza subumbrina 
Peziza subviolacea 
Peziza succosa 
Peziza succosella 
Peziza tarembergensis 
Peziza udicola 
Peziza vacinii 
Peziza varia 
Peziza vesiculosa 
Peziza whitei 
Plicaria 
Plicaria acanthodictya 
Plicaria anthracina 
Plicaria endocarpoides 
Plicaria leiocarpa 
Plicaria trachycarpa 
Plicaria trachycarpa var. ferruginea 
Plicariella 
Plicariella scabrosa 
Ruhlandiella 
Ruhlandiella berolinensis 
Ruhlandiella peregrina 
Ruhlandiella reticulata 
Ruhlandiella truncata 
Sarcopeziza 
Sarcopeziza sicula 
Sarcosphaera 
Sarcosphaera coronaria 
Sarcosphaera crassa 
Scabropezia 
Scabropezia flavovirens 
Scabropezia scabrosa 
Stouffera 
Stouffera longii 
Temperantia 
Temperantia tiffanyae 
Terfezia 
Terfezia albida 
Terfezia alsheikhii 
Terfezia arenaria 
Terfezia boudieri 
Terfezia canariensis 
Terfezia cistophila 
Terfezia claveryi 
Terfezia crassiverrucosa 
Terfezia eliocrocae 
Terfezia extremadurensis 
Terfezia fanfani 
Terfezia grisea 
Terfezia leptoderma 
Terfezia lusitanica 
Terfezia morenoi 
Terfezia olbiensis 
Terfezia pini 
Terfezia pseudoleptoderma 
Terfezia trappei 
Tirmania 
Tirmania honrubiae 
Tirmania nivea 
Tirmania pinoyi 
Ulurua 
Ulurua nonparaphysata

References

 
Ascomycota families
Mushroom types
Taxa named by Barthélemy Charles Joseph Dumortier